Din and Tonic is the debut album by British jazz pianist Janette Mason. It was released in 2005 by Fireball Records and features vocalist Lea DeLaria and saxophonist Mornington Lockett.

Reception

John Fordham, in a four-starred review for The Guardian, described Din and Tonic as "a triumph of elegant themes, catchy hooks, fierce swing, classy execution and uncompromising openness to improvisation. It's beautifully recorded, the production duties also being down to Mason, who presumably knows a studio's potential like the back of her hand. Nothing in this pianist's live jazz work (though she's often sounded like a shrewdly thoughtful accompanist who nonetheless keeps a tight rein on her own desires to get in on the act) has hinted at the breadth and maturity of this set, or the playing and composing skills it reveals."

Track listing
All tracks written by Janette Mason, except where noted.
 "Din and Tonic" – 7:30
 "Urban Chant" – 7:12
 "Hymn to Life" – 7:25
 "November Blues" (Janette Mason, Lea DeLaria) – 6:01
 "Moon River" (Henry Mancini, Johnny Mercer) – 5:59
 "Still Dreaming?" – 5:43
 "The Restraint of Passion" – 7:28
 "911-144 The Last Call" – 7:28

Personnel
 Janette Mason – piano, Hammond organ, keyboards
 Lea DeLaria – vocals
 Mornington Lockett – soprano and tenor saxophones
 Dudley Phillips – acoustic bass
 Mary Ann McSweeney – acoustic bass
 Simon Pearson – drums
 Martin Shaw – trumpet
 Jamie Talbot – alto saxophone
 Mark Nightingale – trombone

References

2005 debut albums
Janette Mason albums